Rooted in agile software development and initially referred to leading self-organizing development teams (Appelo, 2011;), the concept of agile leadership is now used to more generally denote an approach to people and team leadership that is focused on boosting adaptiveness in highly dynamic and complex business environments (Hayward, 2018; Koning, 2020; Solga, 2021).

History
There are many perspectives on the origins of agile leadership, some of which align with the advent of the Agile manifesto. With the rise of Agile software development also a new leadership style arose. When markets are becoming more and more VUCA (Volatility, uncertainty, complexity and ambiguity) organizations have to be able to respond quickly and handle all the uncertainties. In these markets, traditional management is often seen as too slow. Agile promotes giving the teams the mandate and freedom to make their own decisions. Making teams able to respond quickly to new market changes and technological opportunities. This transformed the style of leadership, towards creating the right context and environment for self-managing teams. See Workers' self-management.

The framework for business agility  has also created a set of Agile Leadership principles.  These principles  have been adopted by a number of universities across the globe.  These principles also form the basis of the agile business consortiums views on Agile culture.

This leadership style fits well in today's culture of giving autonomy to employees to do their work and not tell people what to do. Instead, create clarity on the objectives or desired outcome and let people and team discover the best ways to achieve. Next it also fits with the importance of customer-focus or customer-centricity. With the rise of [mobile phones] and [internet] more and more organizations are becoming digital (internet culture). Software is eating the world  Where there primary contact with customers isn't face-to-face but through a digital device. These organizations have to respond quickly to customer feedback and make sure that their customer-satisfaction is high. By giving teams access to NPS (Net Promoter) and CES (Customer success), they can quickly respond and adapt.

Leading self-organizing teams
For some authors, the essence of agile leadership is creating the right environment for self-managing teams. Koning (2019), for example, defines four corresponding areas of action:

 Co-create the goals – instead of giving instructions, rather make sure that the goals are clear. So teams know what to achieve, and if their actions are bringing them any closer to their goal.
 Facilitate Ownership – create an environment in which agile teams can grow and thrive. Teams can't be forced to take Ownership, leaders can only create those circumstances in which teams take ownership. This is a balancing between stepping in and letting go. Finding the sweetspot where teams have the right amount of freedom aligned with their level of maturity.
 Learn faster – being fit and ready for the future is not about being the best, it's about learning faster. Self-managing teams need to get fast feedback on their actions and their decisions. Preferably from users and customers. It's the leaders role to promote learning from experiments and failures.
 Design the culture – The agile leader has to envision, design and improve the culture of the organisation.

'Enabler - disruptor' model of agile leadership
Favoring a more general approach and highlighting the leadership demands linked to digitization, Hayward (2018) describes agile leadership as simultaneously enabling and disrupting teams and the organization (a paradox, he refers to as the 'agile leadership paradox'):

Agile leader as 'enabler'
Learning agility
Clarity of direction
Empathy and trust
Empowering
Working together

Agile leader as 'disruptor'
Thoughtfully decisive
Digitally literate
Questioning the status quo
Creating new ways of thinking
Close to customer trends

'Align - empower' model of agile leadership
This framework (Solga, 2021) strives to integrate the various ideas that have been floating around the concept of agile leadership. It defines the purpose of agile leadership as enabling people and teams to meet performance expectations and customer demands in business/task environments that are charged with VUCA (volatility, uncertainty, complexity, and ambiguity) and where process knowledge (knowing how to produce desired results) is weak.
 
To achieve this, an agile leader needs to simultaneously foster divergence and convergence (Solga, 2021). The former involves enabling and exploiting a multitude and diversity of options and possibilities to boost adaptiveness, that is to say, promote responsiveness, flexibility, and speed to effectively deal with dynamic change and disruptive challenges (the 'empower' component). The latter involves promoting alignment with overarching goals and standards as well as across teams (the 'align' component).

Solga (2021) defines three 'alignment' practices and three 'empowerment' practices:

'Alignment' practices (ensuring convergence):
Motivate: Giving esteem, inspiration, and care to inspire emotional engagement and, with it, 'emotional alignment'
Infuse: Creating value orientation and commitment to the purpose and values of the organization ('normative alignment')
Focus: Creating a shared understanding of goals and priorities, roles, processes, and crucial boundary conditions within teams and across the organization ('task alignment')

'Empowerment' practices (enabling and exploiting divergence):
Facilitate: Providing resources, removing obstacles, enabling self-organization, and giving decision-making discretion ('structural empowerment')
Coach: Enabling people and teams to (co-) operate effectively in 'structurally empowered' task environments ('competency-focused empowerment')
Innovate: Enabling an explorative or iterative approach to problem solving and task delivery (i.e., spiraling between experimentation and reflection, prototyping and feedback); also, promoting a constructive approach to handling tension (understanding frictions and conflicts as 'drivers of development'); since all this is about expanding and testing options to reach improvements and novel solutions, its focus is on 'innovation  empowerment'

See also
Agility
VUCA
Digitization
Leadership
Management

References

Organizational behavior
Leadership